Miguel Martins Abrahão is a prolific Brazilian writer and dramatist, author of numerous plays and books.

Life 
Born in São Paulo, Brazil, on January 25, 1961, Miguel M. Abrahão spent much of his youth in São Paulo, and currently, resides in Rio de Janeiro, with his wife and children.

He graduated  in history,  in pedagogy and journalism, having held various activities in educational institutions, besides devoting much of his time on literature.

He taught History of Brazil for the undergraduate program in journalism at the Unimep (Universidade Metodista de Piracicaba) in the 1980s. In this educational institution was also responsible for implementing the Center Theatre UNIMEP in 1979 and coordinated all activities until theatrical 1981.

Most of his work for children  youth, however, although written during his teens, was not published in book from 1983.

Selected works

Plays 
 As aventuras do Saci Pererê  (children's, 1973)
 Pimpa, a Tartaruga (children's, 1973)
 O Dinheiro (Comedy, 1976)
 Armadilha (peça) (drama, 1976)
 No Mundo Encantado da Carochinha (children's, 1976)
 O Descasamento (Comedy, 1977)
 Pensão Maloca (Comedy, 1977)
 A Casa (Comedy, 1978)
 O Covil das Raposas (Comedy, 1978)
 O Chifrudo  (Comedy, 1978)
 Pássaro da Manhã (teen drama, 1978)
 Alta-Sociedade (Comedy, 1978)
 O Minuto Mágico (Comedy, 1981)
 As Comadres (Comedy, 1981)
 Três (drama, 1981)
 A Escola (historical drama, 1983)
 Bandidos Mareados (children's, 1983)
 O Rouxinol do Imperador  (children's, 1992)

Novels
 O Bizantino (1984)
 A Pele do Ogro (1996)
 O Strip do Diabo (1996)
 A Escola (2007)

Children's bookFundação Biblioteca Nacional 
 As Aventuras de Nina, a Elefanta Esquisita (1971)
 As aventuras do Saci Pererê (1973)
 Biquinho (1973)
 Pimpa, a Tartaruga (1973)
 Confissões de um Dragão (1974)
 Lateco (1974)
 Arabela (1974)
 Junior, o Pato (1974)
 Bonnie e Clyde (1975)
 O Mistério da Cuca (1975)
 O Império dos Bichos (1979)
 O Caso da Pérola Negra (1983)

Non-fiction: The Story of Civilization 
 Introdução aos Estudos Históricos (Editora Salesiana, 1985)
 História Antiga e Medieval (Editora Salesiana, 1985)
 História Antiga (Editora Agbook, 1992)
 História Medieval (Editora Agbook, 1992)

References

External links  
  – Digital Library of Literature of UFSC
 Official blog

1961 births
20th-century Brazilian dramatists and playwrights
Brazilian male dramatists and playwrights
Living people
Brazilian male novelists
20th-century Brazilian male writers
Writers from São Paulo
20th-century Brazilian novelists
21st-century Brazilian dramatists and playwrights
21st-century Brazilian novelists
21st-century Brazilian male writers